Anthothoe chilensis, or striped anemone, is a species of sea anemones in the family Sagartiidae.

Description
Anthothoe chilensis is a small anemone of around 2 cm in diameter. It is vertically striped in pink, green or browns, though it may also be pale in colour.

Distribution
This species is found off Chile, Brazil and Argentina in South America, around St. Helena and off the southern African coast from Luderitz to Richards Bay. It inhabits waters from the intertidal zone to 28m in depth.

Ecology
Anthothoe chilensis shoots sticky defensive threads (acontia) through pores in its body wall when threatened. It has symbiotic bacteria living within its body which supplement its food supply by photosynthesis. Preyed upon by the indica nudibranch Anteaeolidiella foulisi.

References

Sagartiidae
Cnidarians of the Atlantic Ocean
Cnidarians of the Indian Ocean
Cnidarians of the Pacific Ocean
Animals described in 1830
Taxa named by René Lesson